In enzymology, a tryptophanamidase is an enzyme that catalyzes the chemical reaction

L-tryptophanamide + H2O  L-tryptophan + NH3

Thus, the two substrates of this enzyme are L-tryptophanamide and H2O, whereas its two products are L-tryptophan and NH3.

This enzyme belongs to the family of hydrolases, those acting on carbon-nitrogen bonds other than peptide bonds, specifically in linear amides.  The systematic name of this enzyme class is L-tryptophanamide amidohydrolase. Other names in common use include tryptophan aminopeptidase, and L-tryptophan aminopeptidase.  It employs one cofactor, manganese.

References

 

EC 3.5.1
Manganese enzymes
Enzymes of unknown structure